Charles II, Duke of Brunswick (German: Karl II.; 30 October 1804 – 18 August 1873), ruled the Duchy of Brunswick from 1815 until 1830.

Biography
Charles was born in Brunswick, the eldest son of Frederick William, Duke of Brunswick-Lüneburg. In April 1808, his mother, Princess Marie of Baden (1782–1808), died shortly after giving birth to a stillborn daughter when Charles was only three years old. Charles and his younger brother William, went to live with their maternal grandmother, Princess Amalie of Hesse-Darmstadt, in Glückstadt, while his father raised a volunteer corps, the Black Brunswickers, to fight with the Austrians against Napoleon. In the Autumn of 1809, to avoid capture the duke had conducted a remarkable fighting march across Germany and escaped to Britain with his troops; on his arrival in London he sent for his sons who then lived with their paternal grandmother, Princess Augusta of Great Britain at Blackheath and later at Vauxhall. The young princes were treated as celebrities in London, with William being given the honour of laying a foundation stone for Vauxhall Bridge in 1814.

After the death of his father in 1815, Charles inherited the Duchy, but since he was still underage, he was put under the guardianship of George, the prince regent of the United Kingdom and Hanover. When Charles neared his 18th birthday, a dispute over the date of his majority erupted; Charles claimed majority at the age of 18, while George considered the age of majority to be 21 years. A compromise was made, and Charles reached his majority at the age of 19, and took over government on 30 October 1823.

During his 18th year, Hanover speedily rushed in a new constitution which limited his powers, redefined his duchy, hereditary lands, and his due income as head of the house of Este-Guelph. As from 1546 forwards Hanover also paid the Dynastic fidei commis payments to the Wolfenbuettel princes, as heads of house. Until this new redefinition, all of Hanover was considered sub-principalities that conditionally governed in the name of the Wolfenbuettel ruling prince. These sub-principalities included Hanover-Calenberg and Luneburg, the new council of Vienna creation of Kingdom of Hanover in 1814 notwithstanding.

On May 10, 1827, Charles declared in an edict that the new constitution of redefining his sovereignty was invalid. Passing a new constitution during a Regency was also protested for him by Austria. These had gone against all the norms of international law. In the edict Hanover was called a "usurper", and this caused outrage in Hanover and England. The German Confederation that same year attempted to intervene in this matter and ordered Charles to accept the new constitution from his minority. Charles disregarded it, and continued governing as his father had. He did not have his decrees cosigned, but continued as an absolute monarch, as the Guelphs had been for more than 1,000 years.

The ownership of the printing presses ultimately won the battle as the popular opinion was turned against their monarch. Charles's administration was maligned as being corrupt and misguided. When in 1830 the July Revolution broke out, Charles happened to be in Paris. He hurriedly returned to Brunswick, where he announced his intention to suppress all revolutionary tendencies by force. But on 6 September, he was attacked by stone throwers while riding home from the theatre; on the next day, a large mob tried to break into the palace. Charles fled and  the palace was completely destroyed by fire. When Charles's brother, William, arrived in Brunswick on 10 September, he was received joyfully by the people. William originally considered himself only his brother's regent, but after a year declared himself ruling duke. Charles made several desperate attempts to depose his brother by diplomacy and by force, but they were unsuccessful. Charles reportedly had agreements from the French King to send a mercenary army to retake the duchy.

Charles continued to be active in his office as ruling prince in exile. He filed many protests against Hanover, against his brother, and against Prussia's annexation of the Kingdom of Hanover after the 1866 Austro-Prussian War. In his later letters he predicted communism would take the lands from the Prussians.

Charles spent the rest of his life outside of Germany, mostly in Paris and London. While he lived in London he engaged in a high-profile feud with the publisher Barnard Gregory due to articles published about the Duke in The Satirist. After the war between France and Germany broke out, he moved to Geneva, where he died in the Beau-Rivage Hotel in 1873, aged 68.

Brunswick Monument

In his will drawn up on 5 March 1871, Charles left his entire estate to the city of Geneva with a single stipulation: that a mausoleum be built for him in Geneva "in a prominent position and worthy", that it should feature statues of his father, Frederick William, and his grandfather, Charles William Ferdinand, and that it should imitate the style of the 14th century Scaliger Tombs in Verona. Accordingly, a design was chosen by the Swiss architect Jean Franel. Sited on the Quai du Mont-Blanc, it is built in three storeys of white marble with a hexagonal canopy over a sarcophagus bearing a recumbent figure of the duke. At the projecting corners are marble statues of six notable ancestors of the House of Guelph by various sculptors, and a bronze equestrian statue of Duke William by the French sculptor Auguste Cain was originally mounted at the top of the spire. The monument stands on a platform 65 meters long and 25 meters wide and is guarded by marble chimeras and lions, also by Cain.

The monument was unveiled on 14 October 1879; however, earthquake damage resulted in the removal of the equestrian statue to an adjacent plinth in 1883 and the top of the spire was rebuilt with a crown in 1890. The duke's estate amounted to 24 million Swiss Francs, two million of which were expended on the monument, the remainder was spent on a number of new public buildings, for example the Grand Théâtre.

Legacy
A contemporary obituarist referred to the Duke as "that painted, bewigged Lothario, whose follies, eccentricities, and diamonds made him the talk of Europe." During his lifetime he sued several newspaper publishers for libel when they alleged that, among other things, he solicited homosexual encounters. However, in 1849 he won a defamation case for the publication of an article by a newspaper, The Weekly Dispatch, in 1830, after sending a manservant to procure archive copies of the edition from the publishers and the British Museum. No copies now survive, although given the Duke's other legal cases, the nature of the libel may be assumed. However this case (Brunswick v Harmer) established a precedent in English defamation law, as the ruling was interpreted by courts to allow defamation plaintiffs to sue if there was a “new publication” of the original libel. It was used, for example, in 2009 to decree that internet company Google, who made historical libels available on their web pages, could be liable for damages. The multiple publication rule was finally curtailed in the UK by The Defamation Act 2013.

Ancestors

See also
Charles was on the losing side of the Opera game, a famous chess game against Paul Morphy.

References

 Allgemeine Deutsche Biographie, vol. 15, p. 281-285

Charles 02
House of Brunswick-Bevern
Protestant monarchs
German Lutherans
1804 births
1873 deaths
Modern child monarchs
Nobility from Braunschweig
Grand Crosses of the Order of Saint Stephen of Hungary